Tah Tien is a 35mm Thai kaiju film released in 1973 directed by and featuring special effects from Sompote Saengduenchai (a.k.a. Sompote Sands).

Synopsis
Chaba is a magic giant toad in beautiful woman form, she is the daughter of a Queen of Naga who spawns on the human world. She lived alone with an old man in the jungle. One day, a young Bangkok man named Narent came to the jungle to study natural science and zoology. He must adventure with many beasts, including primeval   creatures and flash flood. Finally, he meets Chaba.

He invited Chaba to visit in Bangkok. With her mischievousness, she made the giant temple guard both met, feuding and fighting fiercely at the midstream of Chao Phraya river which place is now known as "Tah Tien".

Cast
Supak Likitkul as Chaba
Sombat Metanee as Narent
Sukon Kewlhiem	as Grandpa
Sompong Pongmitr as Hunter Pong
Tape Subpokpoon as Maseng/ Phaya Naga
Prim Phraphaporn as Queen of Naga
Tape Tienchai as Yak Wat Pho
Sri Suriya as Horse owner
Sipeuak as Yak Wat Jaeng
Chuen-chaeh as Horse thief

Production & reception
Tah Tien is Sompote Saengduenchai's first film. He had been inspired by his studies of Toho and Tsuburaya Productions of Japan in the early 1960s and the Japanese kaiju films of the era, particularly Daimajin from 1966.

The film's plot is a combination of two famed tales from traditional Thai folklore, Uttai Tawee and an urban legend on the origin of the name of Tah Tien (now a pier, market and tourist attraction in Phra Nakhon District near Grand Palace and Wat Pho). The two giants featured in the film and the urban legend are the temple guards of two Thai Buddhist monasteries, or wats on opposite banks of the Chao Phraya River. Yak Wat Jaeng (the Giant of Wat Jaeng) is depicted as a traditional Thai demon, or Yak is stationed at Wat Arun from the Thonburi side ("Wat Arun" was formerly known as "Wat Jaeng," hence the name), while Yak Wat Pho (the Giant of Wat Pho), depicted in the film as an armored Chinese warrior (though Yak Wat Pho was traditionally a Thai yak much like Yak Wat Jaeng) and resides at Wat Pho on the Phra Nakhon (Bangkok) side. The most common version of the legend relates that one day, one of the giants, usually Yak Wat Pho, borrowed money from the other but never got around to resolving the debt. The tension between the two eventually escalated into a major brawl that devastated and flattened the local neighborhood. A mediator eventually stepped in (often cited to be either an angel, a monk, a yogi, the Buddha, or a yak from the royal Wat Phra Kaeo temple) and ordered them to stand down, but the damage had been done. Owing to the flattened landscape as a result of the fight, the area was rechristened "Tah Tien" (or spelt "Tha Tian"), translating roughly as 'Flat Port.' The true origins of the name 'Tah Tien' is still debated to this day.

The film's release met with major success, earning 1.4 million baht from Bangkok cinemas alone almost instantly, eventually winning up to 3 million baht after two weeks of circulation in the countryside. In addition to this, the main theme song of the film Meesak Nakarat became a major hit and remains popular to this day.

For Sompote, the massive success of Tah Tien inspired him to bring Yak Wat Jaeng and Yak Wat Pho back for more roles in his next films, including Jumborg Ace & Giant in 1974  and Magic Lizard in 1985.

References

External links
 

1970s science fiction comedy films
1973 directorial debut films
Giant monster films
Films directed by Sompote Sands
Thai science fiction comedy films
Thai crossover films
Films set in Bangkok